Bay Chene Fleur is a bay in Plaquemines Parish, Louisiana, in the United States.

Bay Chene Fleur is derived from the French for "Mistletoe Bay".

References

Bays of Louisiana
Bodies of water of Plaquemines Parish, Louisiana